Jean Victor Guislain Parmentier (6 November 1883 – 22 June 1936) was a French diplomat.

1883 births
1936 deaths
20th-century French diplomats
French military personnel of World War I
Grand Officiers of the Légion d'honneur
Diplomats from Paris